Liberals Under Autocracy: Modernization and Civil Society in Russia, 1866–1904 is a book by Anton A. Fedyashin about Vestnik Evropy and Russian liberalism in the nineteenth century.

Bibliography

External links 
 Press website
 Project MUSE link

English-language books
2012 non-fiction books
University of Wisconsin Press books
Books about Russia
Books about liberalism